Danielle Matthews (born 16 December 1983) is an Australian singer, musical theatre and cabaret artist who resides in Melbourne.

Matthews attended McKinnon Secondary College then studied Musical Theatre at The Victorian College of the Arts .

In 2009 Matthews became the inaugural winner of the prestigious Rob Guest Endowment Award.

She is best known for her portrayal of Shirley Bassey in the musical biopic Danielle Matthews sings The Songs of Shirley Bassey )

Other theatre credits include Showboat, Respect The Musical, Motor-mouth Loves Suck-face, An Evening with Stephen Sondheim, Respect the Musical (Australia Tour), TRIBE (Anthony Crowley)

Danielle has featured in various concert and TV Performances including Carols by Candlelight at the Myer Music Bowl, The Art Centre's Morning Melodies, The Helpmann Awards, The Circle, Good Morning Australia, Mornings with Kerri Anne and the Today Show.

Danielle has performed the Australian national anthem at the MCG for the opening of one day cricket test series.

In 2013 Danielle recorded her debut album ‘Dream Song‘ with Move Records and more recently, recorded La Belle Epoque for the in-game soundtrack to one of the world's most popular video game series – Assassins Creed Unity.

Danielle performs and works closely with Opera singer/ choral conductor and Australian of the year Dr Jonathon Welch and is the Current Vice President of The Choir of Hard Knocks.

She is currently managed by Mark Gogoll.

References

1983 births
Living people
Australian women singer-songwriters
People from Melbourne
21st-century Australian singers
21st-century Australian women singers